Isom may refer to:

Places
Isom, Kentucky, an unincorporated community in Letcher County
Isom, Virginia, an unincorporated community in Dickenson County
Isom, West Virginia, an unincorporated community in Logan County
Lake Isom, a lake in Lake County, Tennessee

People
Isom (surname)
Isom Dart (1849-1900), American rodeo clown and stunt rider, rancher, and horse and cattle rustler

Other
Isom, a comic book by Cliff Richards and Eric July
ISO base media file format
USS William Isom (ID-1555), a United States Navy tanker